Martina Navratilova and Pam Shriver were the defending champions but only Navratilova competed that year with Candy Reynolds.

Navratilova and Reynolds won in the final 6–2, 6–3 against Andrea Jaeger and Paula Smith.

Seeds
Champion seeds are indicated in bold text while text in italics indicates the round in which those seeds were eliminated.

Draw

Final

Top half

Bottom half

External links
 1983 Family Circle Cup Doubles Draw

Doubles